Hugh Robertson may refer to:
Hugh Robertson (basketball) (born 1989), American basketball player
Hugh Robertson (instrument maker) (1730–1822), Scottish instrument maker
Hugh Robertson (1890s footballer), Scottish footballer for Burnley, Lincoln City, Leicester Fosse
Hugh Robertson (footballer, born 1939) (1939–2010), Scottish footballer
Hugh Robertson (footballer, born 1975), Scottish footballer
Hugh Robertson (politician) (born 1962), British politician
Hugh A. Robertson (1932–1988), American film director and editor
Hugh C. Robertson (1845–1908), American studio potter